Events from the year 2012 in Eritrea

Incumbents 
 President: Isaias Afewerki

Events

January 2012

Sport 
 July 27 to August 12 – Eritrea at the 2012 Summer Olympics in London, United Kingdom.

Unknown dates 
 Eritrea at the 2012 Winter Youth Olympics in Innsbruck, Austria

Births in 2012

Deaths in 2012

January 
 January 1 – Leveie Sans, 24, Eritrean Dancer, car crash (born 1987)

References 

 
2010s in Eritrea 
Years of the 21st century in Eritrea 
Eritrea 
Eritrea